This is a list of first-level country subdivisions which have a nominal gross state product in excess of US$200 billion. There are more than 100 subdivisions that have more than US$200 billion GDP. Those subdivisions which are the largest in their respective countries are shown in bold.

Nominal list

PPP list

References 

Gross state product
GDP (nominal)
GDP, Country Subdivisions
GDP